The 2017 Red Rock Pro Open was a professional tennis tournament played on outdoor hard courts. It was the ninth edition of the tournament and was part of the 2017 ITF Women's Circuit. It took place in Las Vegas, United States, on 11–17 September 2017.

Singles main draw entrants

Seeds 

 1 Rankings as of 28 August 2017.

Other entrants 
The following player received a wildcard into the singles main draw:
  Laura Ashley

The following player received entry using a protected ranking:
  Allie Kiick

The following players received entry from the qualifying draw:
  Elena Bovina
  Nicole Coopersmith
  Sanaz Marand
  Maria Mateas

Champions

Singles

 Sesil Karatantcheva def.  Elitsa Kostova, 6–4, 4–6, 7–5

Doubles
 
 An-Sophie Mestach /  Laura Robson def.  Sophie Chang /  Alexandra Mueller, 7–6(9–7), 7–6(7–2)

External links 
 2017 Red Rock Pro Open at ITFtennis.com
 Official website

2017 ITF Women's Circuit
2017 in American sports
 
2017